John Barrett (born 21 December 1928) is  a former Australian rules footballer who played with Footscray and Fitzroy in the Victorian Football League (VFL).

Notes

External links 		
		
		
		
		
		
		
Living people		
1928 births		
		
Australian rules footballers from Victoria (Australia)		
Western Bulldogs players		
Fitzroy Football Club players
Frankston Bombers players